Shane Lewis-Hughes (born 20 September 1997) is a Welsh rugby union player who plays for Cardiff Rugby as a flanker or lock. He is a Wales under-20 international.

Lewis-Hughes made his debut for Cardiff in 2017 having come through the organisation's academy featuring for both Pontypridd RFC and Cardiff RFC.

International
Lewis-Hughes was named in the Wales squad for the first time for the uncapped international versus the Barbarians on 30 November 2019. He was also named in the Wales squad for the game against Scotland on 31 October 2020 in Wales' final delayed 2020 Six Nations match. He made his debut in the number 6 shirt.

References

External links 
Cardiff Rugby profile

Rugby union players from Pontypridd
Welsh rugby union players
Wales international rugby union players
Cardiff Rugby players
Living people
1997 births
Rugby union flankers